Chester Grant is a community in the Canadian province of Nova Scotia, located in the Chester Municipal District.

References
Chester Grant on Destination Nova Scotia

Communities in Lunenburg County, Nova Scotia